Francis Paul Stevens (Alternate listing: F. Paul Stevens, Paul Stevens) (October 16, 1889 – March 17, 1949) was an American bobsledder who competed in the early 1930s. He won the silver medal in the four-man event at the 1932 Winter Olympics in Lake Placid. He was the brother of fellow bobsledders Curtis Stevens and Hubert Stevens.

References

External links
Bobsleigh four-man Olympic medalists for 1924, 1932–56, and since 1964 
DatabaseOlympics.com profile

1889 births
1949 deaths
American male bobsledders
Bobsledders at the 1932 Winter Olympics
Olympic silver medalists for the United States in bobsleigh
Sportspeople from New York (state)
Medalists at the 1932 Winter Olympics